This is a list of Dutch football transfers for the 2020 summer transfer window. Only transfers featuring Eredivisie are listed.

Eredivisie

Note: Flags indicate national team as has been defined under FIFA eligibility rules. Players may hold more than one non-FIFA nationality.

Ajax

In:

Out:

AZ Alkmaar

In:

Out:

Feyenoord

In:

Out:

PSV Eindhoven

In:

Out:

Willem II

In:

Out:

FC Utrecht

In:

Out:

Vitesse

In:

Out:

Heracles Almelo

In:

Out:

FC Groningen

In:

Out:

SC Heerenveen

In:

Out:

Sparta Rotterdam

In:

Out:

FC Emmen

In:

Out:

VVV-Venlo

In:

Out:

FC Twente

In:

Out:

PEC Zwolle

In:

Out:

Fortuna Sittard

In:

Out:

ADO Den Haag

In:

Out:

RKC Waalwijk

In:

Out:

See also
 2020–21 Eredivisie

References

External links
 Official site of the KNVB
 Official site of the Eredivisie

Football transfers summer 2020
Transfers
2020